Mukim Kuala Belait is a mukim in Belait District, Brunei. The population was 31,308 in 2016. The mukim encompasses Kuala Belait, the administrative town of the district.

Geography 
The mukim is the located in the westernmost part of the district as well as the country. It borders the South China Sea to the north, Mukim Seria to the east, Mukim Kuala Balai to the south-east and the Malaysian state of Sarawak to the south and west.

The primary settlements encompassed by the mukim include Kuala Belait town, Kampong Pandan, Kampong Sungai Teraban and Mumong.

Demographics 
As of 2016 census, the population was 31,308 with  males and  females. The mukim had 5,819 households occupying 5,659 dwellings. The entire population lived in urban areas.

Villages 
As of 2016, Mukim Kuala Belait comprised the following census villages:

Infrastructures

Public housing 
There are two public housing estates in the mukim, namely RPN Kampong Pandan and STKRJ Mumong.

Other locations 
Other locations within the mukim include:
Sungai Tujoh - the location of the customs/immigration point at the border with Sarawak, Malaysia
Rasau - gas field operated by Brunei Shell Petroleum
The mouth of the Belait River, the longest river in Brunei
Istana Kota Manggalela, the residence of Sultan Hassanal Bolkiah in Kuala Belait

References 

Kuala Belait
Belait District